Fit for 55 is a package by the European Union designed to reduce the European Union's greenhouse gas emissions by 55% by 2030. The package was proposed in July 2021 by the European Commission. Under an accelerated legislative process, the plans may become law in 2022. Measures include additional support for clean transport, renewables, and a tariff called the Carbon Border Adjustment Mechanism on emissions for high-carbon imports from countries lacking sufficient greenhouse gas reduction measures of their own. It proposes to extend the Emissions Trading Scheme to transport and heat. Compared to the net-zero scenario from the International Energy Agency, the plan contains more measures to ensure that energy remains affordable.

References 

Carbon emissions in the European Union
Carbon finance
Climate change in the European Union
Energy policies and initiatives of the European Union
Renewable energy law

Sources